Matthew Erickson (born July 30, 1975) is an American former professional infielder and current coach for the Milwaukee Brewers of Major League Baseball (MLB). From 2011 to 2021, he was manager of the Wisconsin Timber Rattlers, the Class A affiliate of the Brewers.

Career
Erickson played collegiate baseball for the University of Arkansas. In 1996, he played collegiate summer baseball with the Wareham Gatemen of the Cape Cod Baseball League. He was drafted by the Florida Marlins in the 7th round of the 1997 Major League Baseball draft, and later signed on December 19, as a minor league free agent with the Milwaukee Brewers after spending several seasons in the minor leagues within the Florida Marlins organization.

Erickson was called up to the Brewers in 2004 where he played in 4 games, and went 1 for 6 with a base hit against Greg Maddux. On June 25, Erickson was released by the Brewers and signed with the Marlins on August 5, 2005. On February 8, Erickson signed a minor league contract with the Arizona Diamondbacks. Erickson became a free agent after the  season.

On December 3, Erickson was named the hitting coach for the Low-A Wisconsin Timber Rattlers in the Milwaukee Brewers organization. In January 2011, he was selected to manage the Timber Rattlers in 2011.

Erickson was promoted to Milwaukee to serve as their infield instructor and assistant hitting coach beginning with the 2022 season.

References

External links

1975 births
Living people
Albuquerque Isotopes players
American expatriate baseball players in Canada
Arkansas Razorbacks baseball players
Baseball coaches from Wisconsin
Baseball players from Wisconsin
Calgary Cannons players
Indianapolis Indians players
Kane County Cougars players
Major League Baseball infielders
Milwaukee Brewers players
Minor league baseball coaches
Minor league baseball managers
Nashville Sounds players
Portland Sea Dogs players
Sportspeople from Appleton, Wisconsin
Tucson Sidewinders players
Utica Blue Sox players
Wareham Gatemen players